Globosusa is a genus of moths of the family Erebidae. The genus was erected by Charles Swinhoe in 1918.

Species
Globosusa borneana Holloway, 2008 Borneo
Globosusa curiosa C. Swinhoe, 1918 Philippines

References

Hypeninae